Kent station is a former train station in Kent, Connecticut. The station building was built in the 1870s to serve passengers on the Housatonic Railroad. The depot was anticipated to be completed and operating by August 1, 1872. However, by April 1873 only the foundation and a portion of the framework was completed. Once completed, the depot was described as "one of the finest" on the Housatonic RR.

The structure still stands today and operates as Kent Station Pharmacy.

Gallery

References 

Former railway stations in Connecticut
Former New York, New Haven and Hartford Railroad stations
 Kent, Connecticut